A lipid profile or lipid panel is a panel of blood tests used to find abnormalities in lipids, such as cholesterol and triglycerides. The results of this test can identify certain genetic diseases and can determine approximate risks for cardiovascular disease, certain forms of pancreatitis, and other diseases.

Lipid panels are usually ordered as part of a physical exam, along with other panels such as the complete blood count (CBC) and basic metabolic panel (BMP).

Components 

The lipid profile typically includes:
 Low-density lipoprotein (LDL)
 High-density lipoprotein (HDL)
 Triglycerides
 Total cholesterol

Using these values, a laboratory may also calculate:
 Very low-density lipoprotein (VLDL)
 Cholesterol:HDL ratio

The lipid profile tests are of 7 types:
 Total lipids
 Serum total cholesterol
 serum HDL cholesterol
 Total cholesterol/HDL cholesterol ratio
 Serum triglycerides
 Serum Phospholipids
 Electrophoretic fractionation to determination percentage of
 (a) Chylomicrons
 (b) LDL
 (c) VLDL
 (d) HDL

Procedure and indication 
Recommendations for cholesterol testing come from the Adult Treatment Panel (ATP) III guidelines, and are based on many large clinical studies, such as the Framingham Heart Study.

For healthy adults with no cardiovascular risk factors, the ATP III guidelines recommend screening once every five years. A lipid profile may also be ordered at regular intervals to evaluate the success of lipid-lowering drugs such as statins.

In the pediatric and adolescent population, lipid testing is not routinely performed. However, the American Academy of Pediatrics and the National Heart, Lung, and Blood Institute (NHLBI) recommend that children aged 9–11 be screened once for severe cholesterol abnormalities. This screening can be valuable to detect genetic diseases such as familial hypercholesterolemia that can be lethal if not treated early.

Traditionally, most laboratories have required patients to fast for 9–12 hours before screening. However, studies have questioned the utility of fasting before lipid panels, and some diagnostic labs routinely accept non-fasting samples.

Typically the laboratory measures only three quantities: total cholesterol; HDL; Triglycerides.  From these three data LDL may be calculated. According to Friedewald's equation:
 [LDL]  [Total cholesterol] − [HDL] − 
Other calculations of LDL from those same three data have been proposed which yield some significantly different results.

VLDL can be defined as the total cholesterol that is neither HDL nor LDL. With that definition, Friedewald's equation yields:
 [VLDL]  
The alternative calculations mentioned above may yield significantly different values for VLDL.

Implications 

This test is used to identify dyslipidemia (various disturbances of cholesterol and triglyceride levels), many forms of which are recognized risk factors for cardiovascular disease and rarely pancreatitis.

A total cholesterol reading can be used to assess an individual's risk for heart disease; however, it should not be relied upon as the only indicator. The individual components that make up total cholesterol reading—LDL, HDL, and VLDL—are also important in measuring risk.

For instance, someone's total cholesterol may be high, but this may be due to very high HDL ("good cholesterol") cholesterol levels,—which can help prevent heart disease (the test is mainly concerned with high LDL, or "bad cholesterol" levels). So, while a high total cholesterol level may help give an indication that there is a problem with cholesterol levels, the components that make up total cholesterol should also be measured.

References

Further reading 
 

Blood tests
Lipids